Fang Chieh-min (born 31 January 1986) is a Taiwanese badminton player. He paired with Lee Sheng-mu in men's doubles. The pair won 3 BWF Super Series titles including 2010 Singapore Super Series, 2010 Indonesia Super Series and 2012 Malaysia Super Series.

Achievements

Asian Championships 
Men's doubles

Mixed doubles

Summer Universiade 
Men's doubles

Mixed doubles

BWF Superseries 
The BWF Superseries, which was launched on 14 December 2006 and implemented in 2007, was a series of elite badminton tournaments, sanctioned by the Badminton World Federation (BWF). BWF Superseries levels were Superseries and Superseries Premier. A season of Superseries consisted of twelve tournaments around the world that had been introduced since 2011. Successful players were invited to the Superseries Finals, which were held at the end of each year.

Men's doubles

  BWF Superseries Finals tournament
  BWF Superseries Premier tournament
  BWF Superseries tournament

BWF Grand Prix 
The BWF Grand Prix had two levels, the Grand Prix and Grand Prix Gold. It was a series of badminton tournaments sanctioned by the Badminton World Federation (BWF) and played between 2007 and 2017.

Men's doubles

Mixed doubles

  BWF Grand Prix Gold tournament
  BWF Grand Prix tournament

References

External links 
 
 

1986 births
Living people
Sportspeople from Taipei
Taiwanese male badminton players
Badminton players at the 2012 Summer Olympics
Olympic badminton players of Taiwan
Badminton players at the 2010 Asian Games
Asian Games competitors for Chinese Taipei
Universiade silver medalists for Chinese Taipei
Universiade bronze medalists for Chinese Taipei
Universiade medalists in badminton
Medalists at the 2007 Summer Universiade
Medalists at the 2011 Summer Universiade
21st-century Taiwanese people